Santa Cruz Futebol Clube is a Brazilian professional football club based in Recife, Pernambuco, that competes in the Série D, the fourth tier of Brazilian football, as well as in the Campeonato Pernambucano, the top flight of the Pernambuco state football league.

History

Early history
On 3 February 1914, eleven young men aging from 14 to 16 years founded a football society. Because the boys used to play football on the streets by the yard of the Santa Cruz Church, the club was named after that church, which is situated on Santa Cruz Street in Recife. At the first meeting, they decided the position of each member, the name of the club "Santa Cruz Foot-Ball Club", and the society's colors.

The original colors were black and white. Some time after, the color pattern was changed because another local team (Sport Club Flamengo) already had those colors. Therefore, the club included the red color by suggestion of Teófilo Batista de Carvalho, also known as Lacraia. Lacraia has participated in all major early events of Santa Cruz's history, except the foundation.

Many people came to see the first match at Derby plains. The "team of boys" as Santa Cruz was called at the time beat Rio Negro (Black River) by 7–0. Rio Negro demanded revenge in another match. Curiously, the terms of the revenge stated that Sílvio Machado (he scored five goals in the first match) could not play. Despite that, Santa Cruz accepted the challenge. Carlindo, who substituted Sílvio Machado, scored six goals and Santa Cruz won again by 9–0. A subsequent victory over the Western Telegraph Company team, very famous at the time, made the popularity of Santa Cruz increase even more.  

The club was almost closed in its very first year. Some members proposed to use the club funds to buy a sugarcane juice extractor. Alexandre Carvalho (see members above) violently disapproved of such an offensive proposal and effectively saved the club. In early 20th century Recife, football was regarded as an elite sport. It was played mostly by upper-class boys and by the workers of English companies that operated in Recife. At that time racism was common and Afro-Brazilians were not allowed to play football. Santa Cruz, however, was the first team in Pernambuco to accept them. Lacraia, was the first one. This fact contributed to the popularity of the team, as black people are numerous in Brazilian population.

In 1915, there was the greatest comeback ever seen in Brazilian football. At the Aflitos stadium, Santa Cruz was trailing by a 5–1 score against América (Pernambuco), however it scored six goals in the final 15 minutes to win 6–5. In 1917, the club was accepted into the Pernambucan Sport League, the old name of the Pernambucan Football Federation.

On January 30, 1919, Santa Cruz beat Botafogo 3–2 on the Malaquias field. Alberto Santos-Dumont, the airplane pioneer, was in Recife, but was unnoticed: Santa Cruz's victory took everyone's attention. On January 31, the Jornal Pequeno (Small Newspaper) printed in the headlines: "Botafogo Futebol Clube is beaten by the home boys by 3–2." It was the first time that a northern-northeastern team beat a team from the south-eastern region of Brazil.

On December 13, 1931, beating Torre by 2–0, Santa Cruz won its first state championship, with Tará and Sherlock as the most important players. On October 10, 1934, the Brazilian National team, which had just arrived home from the 1934 World Cup in Italy, played some friendly matches against the major teams of Pernambuco. Sport Recife was defeated 4–2; Náutico was beaten 8–3, and Santa Cruz was defeated 3–1. Because of a ship delay, the Brazilian team could not continue its trip back to Rio de Janeiro, so Santa Cruz asked for a return match, and this time, Santa Cruz won 3–2.

1960s and 1970s
During the late 1960s and the 1970s, Santa Cruz achieved greater popularity.
Much of that was due to the State Penta-championship that Santa Cruz had won.
Moreover, since Santa Cruz's impressive performances in the National championship, the importance of the club was finally recognized beyond the state of Pernambuco.

The participation of Santa Cruz in the Serie A lead the club to gain some credibility in 1965 after beating Flamengo 3–1 at the Maracanã Stadium. The club were having great performances and obtained first place in the National Championship's first stage.

In 1972, Pelé played his 1000th match against Santa Cruz.

In 1975, Santa Cruz reached the semifinals of the Campeonato Brasileiro, a first for a northeastern team. The controversial semi-final against Cruzeiro on December 7 ended with Cruzeiro winning 3–2. The club achieved fourth place, their best performance in the National Championship to date. In 1977 and 1978, Santa Cruz went unbeaten for 35 games in a row in the Brazilian Championship, the second greatest unbeaten run in the national competition. In 1978, Santa Cruz was the first team to qualify for the 2nd Stage of the National Championship, with 23 points. In the second and third stages, Santa Cruz topped both of their groups, and qualified for the quarterfinals, where they lost to Sport Club Internacional. In the final standings, Santa Cruz finished in fifth.

1980s and 1990s
During the 1980s, Santa Cruz was demoted to the Second Division of the National Championship twice, in 1982 and 1989. Since then the club's performance in national competitions has declined.

In the early 1990s, Santa Cruz won three state championships: 1990, 1993, and 1995. However, being in the second division of the National Championship often eclipsed such achievements. Moreover, in the following years, Santa Cruz had to share the status of champion 5 times in a row with an arch-rival. Santa Cruz was not able to stop Sport Recife from winning their 5th successive championship. Nevertheless, in 1996, Maurício was the top scorer of the 2nd Division Brazilian Championship with 13 goals.

2000–present: Further decline 
Since the final match in the 2006 Campeonato Pernambucano vs. Sport, in which Sport won the championship, the team has experienced a new decline. It was demoted to Second Division in 2006 and then to the Third Division in 2007 after a weak campaign. That latest decline also included eliminations in the first rounds of the 2007 Copa do Brasil and 2009 Copa do Brasil by weaker teams like Nacional Fast Clube and Americano, who were both playing regional competitions at the time. 

Continuing the decline was the downfall into Hexagonal da Morte, the bottom six, in the 2008 Campeonato Pernambucano, narrowly escaping relegation in the seventh match. Also, in September 2008, after another weak campaign in the 2008 Série C, Santa Cruz was relegated to the new Fourth Division for 2009, becoming the first club to fall from First Division to Fourth in three years.

But in 2011, Santa Cruz started a reaction. The club was eliminated from the  Copa do Brasil in the second phase by São Paulo, but had a respectable performance. Santa Cruz won the first game 1–0, but lost in the second game 2–0. On May 15, Santa Cruz won the Campeonato Pernambucano, beating Sport Recife, and 

In 2013, Santa Cruz won the Campeonato Pernambucano, and became tricampeao (three-time consecutive champion), beating rivals Sport Recife as they had done in 2011 and 2012 as well. 

In May 2016, Santa Cruz won the Copa do Nordeste for the first time in its history, and earned a spot in the 2016 Copa Sudamericana, their first international participation. The team began their campaign in the second stage, beating Sport Recife 1–0 on aggregate. In the third stage, the club was paired up with Colombian club Independiente Medellín. Santa Cruz lost the first leg in Colombia 2–0, but won 3–1 in Recife with a hat-trick from Grafite, although it was not enough and the club was eliminated on away goals. The team also won the Campeonato Pernambuco that year, beating Sport again, as they had done in the previous four finals.

Symbols

Colors
The original colors of the club were black and white. However, at that time, the Pernambucan Sport League did not allow the participation of different clubs with the same colors. Thus, the red color was introduced to differentiate from the color pattern of Sport Club Flamengo.

Santa Cruz is also known as O Tricolor (The Tricolor) and its fans
as Tricolores.

Badge
The original badge (not depicted here) was designed by Teófilo Batista de Carvalho aka Lacraia.
The inclusion of red colour in the club patterns is also due to Lacraia.

As time passed, the badge design was modified and updated. However the Lacraias original concept was not much modified.

The current badge contains several stars. The top three-colored stars represent the three Super-championships that Santa Cruz won. The bottom golden stars represent the Penta-championship.

Mascot
With the adoption of three colors, the striped jersey of Santa Cruz resembled a Coral snake. Due to this, the team is known by the fans as Coral.

Anthem
The official anthem of the club is widely unknown by the fans. However, a march named O Mais Querido (The Dearest One) by Lourenço da Fonseca Barbosa (Capiba) is very popular and is the de facto anthem.

Stadium
The team's stadium is in Arruda, a borough of Recife. The official name of the stadium is Estádio José do Rego Maciel, after the name of a former mayor of Recife. However, it is widely known as Estádio do Arruda (Arruda Stadium). The fans call it Arrudão (Big Arruda) or Mundão do Arruda (Great Land of Arruda).

On April 1, 1982 the stadium was re-inaugurated after improvements and enlargement. From the original capacity of 64,000 people, the maximum capacity was then estimated at 110,000. However, due to safety reasons, the maximum audience so far is 90,200 in a Brazil vs Argentina match on March 23, 1994. Since then the official stadium capacity has been reduced to 60,044.

The stadium is also known as the Repúblicas Independentes do Arruda (Independent Republics of Arruda).

Titles

National
Campeonato Brasileiro Série C: 1
2013

Regional
Copa do Nordeste: 1
2016

State
Campeonato Pernambucano (Pernambuco State Championship): 29
1931, 1932, 1933, 1935, 1940, 1946, 1947, 1957, 1959, 1969, 1970, 1971, 1972, 1973, 1976, 1978, 1979, 1983, 1986, 1987, 1990, 1993, 1995, 2005, 2011, 2012, 2013, 2015, 2016

Other
Torneio Hexagonal Norte-Nordeste de 1967

Torneio Início (Pernambuco Start Tournament): 12
1919, 1926, 1937, 1939, 1946, 1947, 1954, 1956, 1969, 1971, 1972, 1976
Copa Pernambuco (Pernambuco Cup): 5
2008, 2009, 2010, 2012, 2019

The Super-Championship
The Pernambucan Football Championship is usually divided into three turns. Each turn is a small championship itself. If a team wins all the three turns then it is automatically declared as champion. If a team wins two turns and another team wins the remaining turn, the championship has a final play-off. Generally, the play-off consists of two matches or three matches. However, if three different teams win each one a turn, the championship has a play-off named Super-championship. The Super-championship consists of a play-off among the three winners of each turn. Super-championships are rare and very prestigious.

The Blue Ribbon.
The Blue Ribbon is a prestigious award given by the Brazilian Football Confederation (Confederação Brasileira de Futebol – CBF).
Teams that go abroad on tour without being defeated are natural candidates for this recognition.

In the Middle East, Santa Cruz played against the national teams of
Kuwait (1–5 and 1–1)
Bahrain (0–3)
Qatar (0–4 and 1–4)
Dubai (one of the Arab Emirates) (1–2)
Abu Dhabi (one of the Arab Emirates) (0–3)

Santa Cruz also played
Al-Aim (0–3)
Nasser Sport Club (2–6)
Al-Hilal of Saudi Arabia (0–3)

In Europe there were two matches. The first was against Romania national team (2–4), and the second against Paris Saint-Germain (2–2).

Rivals
Santa Cruz has two major rivals within the city of Recife:

 Sport Recife
 Náutico

The rivalry between Santa Cruz and Sport is known as Clássico das Multidões, and the rivalry between Santa Cruz and Náutico is known as Clássico das Emoções.

Current squad

Idols

 Rivaldo
 Grafite
 Barbosa
 Givanildo Oliveira
 Levir Culpi
 Luciano Veloso
 Birigui
 Luiz Damasceno
 Marlon
 Nunes
 Ramón
 Ricardo Rocha
 Tará
 Sherlock
 Zequinha
 Zé Carmo
 Renatinho
 Tiago Cardoso
 Henágio
 Dênis Marques
 Flávio Caça-Rato
 Keno

Notable coaches

 Ricardo Diéz (1959)
 Evaristo de Macedo (1972)
 Paulo Emilio (1973), (1975)
 Ênio Andrade (1977)
 Evaristo de Macedo (1977–79)
 Paulo Emilio (1980)
 Carlos Alberto Silva (1983–84)
 Lori Sandri (1984)
 Paulinho de Almeida (1987)
 Moisés (1987)
 Abel Braga (1987–88)
 Givanildo Oliveira (1989–90)
 Valmir Louruz (1994)
 Péricles Chamusca (1996)
 Givanildo Oliveira (1998–99)
 Otacílio Gonçalves (1999–02)
 Heron Ferreira (2002)
 Péricles Chamusca (2002–04)
 Roberval Davino (2004)
 Givanildo Oliveira (2004–06), (2006)
 Valdir Espinosa (2006)
 René Simões (2006)
 Giba (2006)
 Evaristo de Macedo (2007)
 Mauro Fernandes (2007)
 Ricardo Rocha (2008)
 Márcio Bittencourt (2008–09)
 Dado Cavalcanti (2009–10)
 Lori Sandri (2010)
 Givanildo Oliveira (2010)
 Zé Teodoro (2011–12)
 Marcelo Martelotte (2013)
 Vica (2013–14)
 Sérgio Guedes (2014)
 Ricardinho (2015)
 Marcelo Martelotte (2015–16)
 Milton Mendes (2016)
 Doriva (2016)
 Vinícius Eutrópio (2017)
 Givanildo Oliveira (2017)
 Marcelo Martelotte (2017)

References

External links
 Official Site 
 RSSSF Brazil – Full listings with the historical results of the Pernambucan Championship.

 
Association football clubs established in 1914
1914 establishments in Brazil